Pelkhil School is a private co-educational school located in Thimphu the capital of Bhutan, offering education from pre-primary until grade 12. It was founded in March 2010.

Overview 
The school is headed by a Board of Directors, who appoint the Principal and Faculty. There are four houses, each headed by a teacher, selected from the more senior members of the teaching staff.

Pelkhil had 700 students in 2015, with the enrollment increasing every year.

Pelkhil has 24 classrooms, four laboratories, faculty centre, conference hall, recreational hall, library, central server room, Judo dojo, music and dance room, cafeteria. It has one football field, two basketball courts, volleyball courts and a table tennis room.

School terms 
There are two academic terms during the calendar year. The first term begins in the third week of February and ends at the end of June. The second term begins in the third week of July and ends in the third week of December.

Houses 
Students are separated into houses Taag (tiger), Chhung (bird), Singye (lion) and Druk (dragon).

Uniform 
All students wear school uniform which consists of a grey mathra gho for boys and kira for girls. For boys the tego is white while for girls the tego is maroon with a light grey wongju. Black socks and shoes are worn.

Sports 
Sport is an important part of the education program offered at Pelkhil. There are two football fields, two basketball courts, two volleyball courts, badminton, table tennis, and judo facilities.

Fees
The fee structure is approved by the Ministry of Education.

School magazines 
The Pelkhil School Yearbook, the annual school magazine.

References

External links
Pelkhil School website
School Photo gallery

Educational institutions established in 2010
Schools in Bhutan
2010 establishments in Bhutan